Everything Is Everything is the second studio album by American singer Diana Ross, released on November 3, 1970 by Motown Records. After her self-titled debut and its accompanying two singles, including "Ain't No Mountain High Enough," Motown rushed the release of its follow-up. Musicians Deke Richards and Hal Davis were commissioned to produce Everything is Everything as slightly more pop than her soulful debut with Ashford & Simpson and the album included cover versions of contemporary hits by The Beatles and The Carpenters.

The album reached number 42 on the US Billboard 200 and peaked at number five on the US Top R&B/Hip-Hop Albums, selling over 200,000 copies. Lead single "I'm Still Waiting" became a number-one hit in the UK in 1971, while follow-up "Doobedood'ndoobe, Doobedood'ndoobe, Doobedood'ndoo" reached number 12. Ross' rendering of Aretha Franklin's "Call Me (I Love You)" was nominated for a Grammy in 1971 in the Best Female R&B Vocal Performance category. An expanded edition of the album featuring remixes and unreleased outtakes had its first CD release in the US on April 18, 2008. It includes another Beatles cover ("Something") as well as "What Are You Doing the Rest of Your Life?" also recorded by Barbra Streisand.

Critical reception

Allmusic editor Lindsay Planer wrote in his retrospective review that "although Everything Is Everything failed to exceed – or even meet – the chart achievements of its long-playing predecessor, many enthusiasts consider it to be a worthy companion."

Track listing

Original release

2008 expanded edition

Charts

References

1970 albums
Diana Ross albums
Motown albums
Albums produced by Hal Davis
Albums produced by Deke Richards